Russell James Teibert (born December 22, 1992) is a Canadian professional soccer player currently playing as a midfielder for Vancouver Whitecaps FC in Major League Soccer and the Canada national team.

Club career

Youth and amateur
Teibert attended St. Paul High School (Ontario) in Niagara Falls, Ontario, and is of German and Italian descent. He had a brief spell with Toronto FC's academy, before joining the Vancouver Whitecaps Residency program in 2008. He appeared in friendly games with the Residency team during tours of Japan, Germany and Spain, and played in the prestigious Dallas Cup against youth academies from Argentina's Club Atlético River Plate and Germany's Eintracht Frankfurt and Brazil's São Paulo FC.

Teibert also played with the Vancouver Whitecaps Residency team in the USL Premier Development League in 2009 and 2010.

Vancouver Whitecaps FC
Following the conclusion of the 2010 PDL season Teibert was called up to the Vancouver Whitecaps senior team. He made his professional debut on July 31, 2010 in a 2–2 tie with the Carolina RailHawks. In doing so, Teibert became the 10th youngest player to appear in a competitive match for the Whitecaps men's team at 17 years and 221 days.

The club moved to Major League Soccer for the 2011 season. Teibert had a successful preseason and signed with the MLS Vancouver Whitecaps FC on March 17, 2011. The league signed Teibert to a Generation Adidas contract which made his salary exempt from the league's salary cap for a period normally lasting 1–3 years. Teibert was also signed as a homegrown player from Vancouver's residency program, meaning he did not have to go through the MLS SuperDraft process.

He made his MLS debut on March 19, in Vancouver's 2011 MLS opener against Toronto FC. On May 11, 2013 Teibert scored his first two professional goals, both in the second half, against the LA Galaxy in a 3–1 Whitecaps victory. Teibert would play in a number of positions with the Whitecaps in his first few years; as a winger in 2011, as a fullback in 2012, again as a winger in 2013, and finally as a defensive midfielder when coach Carl Robinson took over in 2014. Teibert would serve as captain during the 2014 Canadian Championship, and would also play in the 2014 MLS Homegrown Game that same season. During the 2015 Canadian Championship, Teibert would win the George Gross Memorial Award as tournament MVP as the Whitecaps won the Voyageurs Cup for the first time in their history.

After appearing in 23 matches in 2015, Teibert would struggle for playing time during the 2016 season, appearing in only 11 matches with 8 starts, despite earning praise from head coach Carl Robinson. In the 2017 MLS season, Teibert would struggle again for playing time, and would not have his option exercised by the Whitecaps. However a few days later he would re-sign with the club on a new three-year contract through the 2020 season. He scored his first goal in five years for Vancouver, netting the opener in a 2–1 victory over Toronto FC on October 6, 2018.

In July 2020, during his tenth year with the Whitecaps, Teibert would sign a contract extension with the club through the 2023 season, with an option for 2024.

International career
Teibert has represented Canada at U-17, and U-20 levels. He was selected in Canada's squad for the 2009 CONCACAF U-17 Championship, and scored a goal from the penalty spot in their 1–1 draw with Honduras on April 21, 2009. Teibert was awarded the Canadian U-17 Player of the Year award in both 2008 and 2009, he became the first player in history to win the honour twice.

Teibert earned his first cap for Canada's senior team August 15, 2012 in a friendly against Trinidad and Tobago. Teibert came on as a second-half substitute for Patrice Bernier, the game ended in a 2–0 victory. On June 27, 2013 Teibert was listed as a part of the confirmed 23-man squad for Colin Miller's Canada squad for 2013 CONCACAF Gold Cup.

After almost a year in between call-ups, in which rumours circulated of a row between player and coach, Teibert was recalled by Benito Floro on November 6, 2014 for a friendly against Panama. Teibert scored his first international goal off a penalty kick in a 2018 FIFA World Cup qualifier against Dominica on June 11, 2015. On June 22, Teibert was named to Canada's squad for the 2015 CONCACAF Gold Cup.

Teibert continued to feature under new Canada coach Octavio Zambrano, appearing in Zambrano's first match in charge against Curaçao on June 13, 2017 and being named to Canada's squad at the 2017 CONCACAF Gold Cup on June 27.

In May 2019 Teibert was named to the 23-man squad for the 2019 CONCACAF Gold Cup.

Career statistics

Club

International

Scores and results list Canada's goal tally first, score column indicates score after each Teibert goal.

Honours

Club 
Vancouver Whitecaps FC
Canadian Championship: 2015; 2022

Individual
Canadian U-17 Player of the Year: 2008, 2009
George Gross Memorial Trophy: 2015

See also
List of one-club men in association football

References

External links
 
 
 
 

1992 births
2013 CONCACAF Gold Cup players
2015 CONCACAF Gold Cup players
2017 CONCACAF Gold Cup players
Association football midfielders
Canada men's youth international soccer players
Canada men's under-23 international soccer players
Canada men's international soccer players
Canadian soccer players
Homegrown Players (MLS)
Living people
Major League Soccer players
Soccer people from Ontario
Sportspeople from Niagara Falls, Ontario
Toronto FC players
USL League Two players
USSF Division 2 Professional League players
Vancouver Whitecaps Residency players
Vancouver Whitecaps (1986–2010) players
Vancouver Whitecaps FC players
Vancouver Whitecaps FC U-23 players
Canadian people of German descent
Canadian people of Italian descent
2019 CONCACAF Gold Cup players